Marcus Dewayne Hicks (born November 25, 1975) is an American mixed martial artist who last competed in 2014. A professional since 2002, he is perhaps best remembered for his six-fight stint in the WEC, but also competed for Legacy FC.

Mixed martial arts career

Early career
Hicks made his professional mixed martial arts debut on January 26, 2002, defeating Ben Hand at Rocky Mountain Slammer 1 via armbar submission. Following this win, Hicks would compile a record of 5–0 before signing with WEC.

World Extreme Cagefighting
After winning his first three fights in the WEC by guillotine choke, Hicks fought Jamie Varner for the WEC Lightweight Championship losing by TKO in the first round.

Hicks next fought former WEC lightweight champion Rob McCullough at WEC 39 on March 1, 2009, losing by majority decision.

In his fight at WEC 42 on August 9, 2009, Hicks lost to Shane Roller by unanimous decision.  After his loss to Roller, Hicks was subsequently released from the promotion.

Legacy FC

After being away from the sport for two and a half years, Hicks returned to face Kamaru Usman at Legacy FC 33 on July 18, 2014.  He lost the fight via TKO in the second round.

Personal life
Marcus has a daughter.

Mixed martial arts record

|-
| Loss
| align=center| 10–4 (1)
| Kamaru Usman
| TKO (punches)
| Legacy FC 33
| 
| align=center| 2
| align=center| 5:00
| Dallas, Texas, United States
|
|-
| Win
| align=center| 10–3 (1)
| Joshua Lee
| Submission (guillotine choke)
| EF: Element Fighting
| 
| align=center| 2
| align=center| 0:42
| Plano, Texas, United States
|Welterweight debut.
|-
| Win
| align=center| 9–3 (1)
| Anthony Macias
| Submission (armbar)
| Supreme Warrior Championship
| 
| align=center| 1
| align=center| 2:30
| Frisco, Texas, United States
|
|-
| Loss
| align=center| 8–3 (1)
| Shane Roller
| Decision (unanimous)
| WEC 42
| 
| align=center| 3
| align=center| 5:00
| Las Vegas, Nevada, United States
|Catchweight (159 lbs) bout; Hicks missed weight.
|-
| Loss
| align=center| 8–2 (1)
| Rob McCullough
| Decision (majority)
| WEC 39
| 
| align=center| 3
| align=center| 5:00
| Corpus Christi, Texas, United States
|
|-
| Loss
| align=center| 8–1 (1)
| Jamie Varner
| TKO (punches)
| WEC 35: Condit vs. Miura
| 
| align=center| 1
| align=center| 2:08
| Las Vegas, Nevada, United States
| 
|-
| Win
| align=center| 8–0 (1)
| Ed Ratcliff
| Submission (guillotine choke)
| WEC 33: Marshall vs. Stann
| 
| align=center| 1
| align=center| 1:42
| Las Vegas, Nevada, United States
|
|-
| Win
| align=center| 7–0 (1)
| Scott McAfee
| Submission (guillotine choke)
| WEC 30
| 
| align=center| 1
| align=center| 2:15
| Las Vegas, Nevada, United States
|
|-
| Win
| align=center| 6–0 (1)
| Sergio Gomez
| Submission (guillotine choke)
| WEC 27
| 
| align=center| 2
| align=center| 3:20
| Las Vegas, Nevada, United States
|
|-
| Win
| align=center| 5–0 (1)
| Hector Munoz
| TKO (punches)
| Ultimate Texas Showdown 4
| 
| align=center| 2
| align=center| 0:10
| Texas, United States
|
|-
| Win
| align=center| 4–0 (1)
| Frank Kirmse
| Submission
| Inferno Promotions: Meltdown
| 
| align=center| 1
| align=center| N/A
| Plano, Texas, United States
|
|-
| NC
| align=center| 3–0 (1)
| Fred Leavy
| No Contest (premature stoppage)
| Venom - First Strike
| 
| align=center| 1
| align=center| 5:00
| Huntington Beach, California, United States
|
|-
| Win
| align=center| 3–0
| Keith Wilson
| TKO (cut)
| King of the Rockies
| 
| align=center| 2
| align=center| 1:12
| Fort Collins, Colorado, United States
|
|-
| Win
| align=center| 2–0
| Tony Tucci
| Submission (strikes)
| ISCF: Anarchy in August
| 
| align=center| 1
| align=center| N/A
| Atlanta, Georgia, United States
|
|-
| Win
| align=center| 1–0
| Ben Hand
| Submission (armbar)
| Rocky Mountain Slammer 1
| 
| align=center| 2
| align=center| 1:23
| Colorado Springs, Colorado, United States
|

References

External links
 

1975 births
Living people
American male mixed martial artists
Mixed martial artists from Texas
Lightweight mixed martial artists
Mixed martial artists utilizing Brazilian jiu-jitsu
African-American mixed martial artists
Boxers from Texas
Middleweight boxers
African-American boxers
American practitioners of Brazilian jiu-jitsu
People awarded a black belt in Brazilian jiu-jitsu
American male boxers
21st-century African-American sportspeople
20th-century African-American sportspeople